Pryors Branch is a stream in Franklin County in the U.S. state of Missouri.
 
Pryors Branch most likely has the name of William Pryor, a pioneer settler.

See also
List of rivers of Missouri

References

Rivers of Franklin County, Missouri
Rivers of Missouri